This is a list of the National Register of Historic Places listings in Calhoun County, Iowa.

This is intended to be a complete list of the properties and districts on the National Register of Historic Places in Calhoun County, Iowa, United States.  Latitude and longitude coordinates are provided for many National Register properties and districts; these locations may be seen together in a map.

There are 12 properties listed on the National Register in the county.

|}

Former listings
Two properties were once listed on the Register but have since been removed:

|}

See also

 List of National Historic Landmarks in Iowa
 National Register of Historic Places listings in Iowa
 Listings in neighboring counties: Carroll, Greene, Pocahontas, Sac, Webster

References

Calhoun

Buildings and structures in Calhoun County, Iowa